Omar Al-Shaheen (Arabic: عمر الشاهين) (born 3 September 1992) is a pool player from Kuwait. Al-Shaheen reached his highest ranking on the World Pool-Billiard Association rankings in 2022, reaching 4th in the world. In 2018, he won 45th Annual Texas Open 9-Ball Championship. At the 2021 WPA World Nine-ball Championship, Al-Shaheen reached the final before losing to Albin Ouschan 9-13.

Titles
 2019 Big Tyme Classic Open 9-Ball 
 2018 Texas Open 9-Ball Championship

References

External links 

 Omar al-Shaheen on the European Pocket Billiard Federation website

1992 births
Kuwaiti people
Kuwaiti pool players
Living people
Cue sports players at the 2010 Asian Games